Hoor Pari is a 2018 Pakistani television series that aired on A-Plus Entertainment from 23 December 2018 to 30 June 2019. It stars Saman Ansari, Alizeh Shah, Ammara Butt, Nadia Afgan and Saleem Sheikh in leading roles. The show aired a new episode every Sunday evening.

Cast
Saman Ansari as Fehmida; Durdana and Gul Naz's mother, hajra and ruqaiya's younger sister
Alizeh Shah as Gul Naz; Fehmida's daughter, Durdana's older sister, Hajra and Ruqaiya's niece
Ammara Butt as Durdana; Fehmida's Daughter, Gul Naz's younger sister, hajra and ruqaiya's niece
Nadia Afgan as Hajra; Amjad's mother, Najeeb's wife, Zulqanain's older sister, Batool's aunt and later mother in law, Fehmida's older sister
Saleem Sheikh as Najeeb; Amjad's father, Hajra's husband, Zulqanain's brother in law
Nasreen Qureshi as Ghazala; Durdana and Gul Naz's paternal grand mother
Usman Butt as Amjad; Hajra and Najeeb's son, Fehmida's and Zulqanain's nephew dDurdana and Gul Naz's cousin, Batool's husband
Armans Ali Pasha as Imran; Ruqaiya and Zulqanain's son, Batool's older brother, Fehmida and Hajra's nephew, Durdana and Gul Naz's cousin

References

Pakistani drama television series
Urdu-language television shows
2018 Pakistani television series debuts
2019 Pakistani television series debuts
A-Plus TV original programming